"Kids" is a duet between singers Robbie Williams and Kylie Minogue, released as the second single from Sing When You're Winning, Williams' third studio album, and the third single from Light Years, Minogue's seventh studio album. Williams and his then songwriting partner Guy Chambers co-wrote the song for Minogue.

The track was written when Minogue approached Williams to write her some songs for what would be her first album under Parlophone, Light Years. It was then that Williams felt the chemistry and decided to turn the song into a duet as well as include the track on his album and release it as a single. It was released on 9 October 2000 and reached number two in the United Kingdom while becoming a top-10 hit in five other countries. Williams performs a rap on the song comparing himself to Sean Connery and including the line "Press be asking do I care for sodomy/I don't know/Yeah, probably", which was entirely removed for radio play and the version on Minogue's album.

"Kids" was re-recorded for William's compilation album, XXV, released on 9 September 2022. Minogue and Williams recorded new vocals with an updated, funkier arrangement.

Music video
The music video for the song contains several references to the musical film Grease, particularly in the choreography between Williams and Minogue.

Chart performance
The song became a hit in the United Kingdom, reaching number two and selling over 200,000 copies to earn a silver certification from the BPI. The track also entered the top 10 in Hungary, Iceland, Ireland, New Zealand, and Portugal, and it peaked at number 14 in Kylie Minogue's native Australia, where "Kids" is certified gold for shipments of over the 35,000 copies. The lyrics, although penned by Robbie Williams and Guy Chambers, make numerous references to the careers of both Minogue and Williams. Minogue's lyric "I've been dropping beats since Back in Black" is a self-deprecating reference to her 1980s pop image when she was known as the singing budgie from Australia—Back in Black being a 1980s album by Australian band AC/DC and of a stark contrast to her own style at the time. Later, in 2010, this song is used as the theme song of Junior Masterchef Australia.

Track listings

Australian CD1
 "Kids" – 4:47
 "John's Gay" – 3:40
 "Often" – 2:46
 "Rock DJ" (video)

Australian CD2
 "Kids" – 4:47
 "Karaoke Star" – 4:10
 "Kill Me or Cure Me" – 2:14
 "Kids" (video)

European CD single
 "Kids" – 4:47
 "John's Gay" – 3:40
 "Kids" (video)

UK CD1
 "Kids" – 4:47
 "John's Gay" – 3:40
 "Often" – 2:46
 "Kids" (video)

UK CD2
 "Kids" – 4:47
 "Karaoke Star" – 4:10
 "Kill Me or Cure Me" – 2:14

UK cassette single
 "Kids" – 4:47
 "John's Gay" – 3:40
 "Often" – 2:46

Credits and personnel
Credits are taken from the Sing When You're Winning album booklet.

Studios
 Recorded at Master Rock Studios (North London, England) and Sarm Hook End (Reading, England)
 Mixed at Battery Studios (London, England)
 Mastered at Metropolis Mastering (London, England)

Personnel

 Robbie Williams – writing, lead vocals
 Guy Chambers – writing, all keyboards, production, arrangement
 Kylie Minogue – lead vocals
 Gary Nuttall – backing vocals
 Katie Kissoon – backing vocals
 Sylvia Mason-James – backing vocals
 Tessa Niles – backing vocals
 Paul "Tubbs" Williams – backing vocals
 Claire Worrall – backing vocals
 Neil Taylor – guitars
 Winston Blissett – bass guitar
 Phil Spalding – fuzz bass
 Andy Duncan – drum programming
 Chris Sharrock – percussion
 Steve Power – production, mixing
 Richard Flack – Pro Tools
 Jim Brumby – Pro Tools
 Tony Cousins – mastering

Charts

Weekly charts

Year-end charts

Certifications

References

2000 songs
2000 singles
Chrysalis Records singles
Kylie Minogue songs
Male–female vocal duets
Robbie Williams songs
Song recordings produced by Guy Chambers
Songs written by Guy Chambers
Songs written by Robbie Williams